Salem-I is a former state assembly constituency in Tamil Nadu.

History
Until 2008, the city of Salem was part of the Salem I and Salem II assembly constituencies. Since 1977, the ADMK party won the Salem I assembly seat five times (1977, 1980, 1984, 2001 and 2006); Dravida Munnetra Kazhagam won twice (1989 and 1996), and the Indian National Congress (INC) won in 1991.

The constituencies of Salem were redrawn as Salem North, Salem South and Salem West in 2008.

Members of the Legislative Assembly

Madras State 
Elections and winners in the constituency are listed below.

Tamil Nadu

Election results

2006

2001

1996

1991

1989

1984

1980

1977

1971

1967

1962

1957

References

External links
 

Former assembly constituencies of Tamil Nadu
Salem district
Government of Salem, Tamil Nadu